Tep may refer to:

Languages
Tep language, spoken in Nigeria
Tepecano language, once spoken in Mexico (ISO 639: tep)

People from Cambodia with the surname
Tep Rindaro (born 1963), actor and karaoke singer
Tep Vanny (born 1980), land activist
Tep Vong (born 1932), Buddhist monk
Tep Boprek (born 1993), pop singer
Tep Sothy (born 1973), politician in Takéo
Tep Ngorn, politician in Kandal

Other uses
Tep Pranam, a Hindu temple in Angkor Thom, Cambodia
Tep Sodachan, a 1968 Khmer-language film
Tep Wireless, British telecommunications multinational
Tep Songva, another Khmer film

See also
TEP (disambiguation)